Earl of Powis (Powys) is a title that has been created three times. The first creation came in the Peerage of England in 1674 in favour of William Herbert, 3rd Baron Powis, a descendant of William Herbert, 1st Earl of Pembroke (c. 1501–1570). In 1687, he was further honoured when he was made (and as detailed at the article of) Marquess of Powis.

The title was created again in 1748 in the Peerage of Great Britain for Henry Arthur Herbert, the husband of Barbara, daughter of Lord Edward Herbert, brother of William, 3rd Marquess of Powis. He notably represented Bletchingley and Ludlow in Parliament and served as Lord Lieutenant of Montgomeryshire and Shropshire. Herbert had already been created Baron Herbert of Chirbury in 1743 and was made Baron Powis and Viscount Ludlow at the same time he was given the earldom. In 1749 he was also created Baron Herbert of Chirbury and Ludlow, with remainder firstly to his brother Richard Herbert and secondly to his kinsman Francis Herbert, of Ludlow. His son, the second Earl, was also Lord Lieutenant of Montgomeryshire and Shropshire. However, on his death in 1801 all the titles became extinct (the persons in remainder to the 1749 barony had died without heirs before the 2nd Earl).

The title was created for the third time in the Peerage of the United Kingdom in 1804 when Edward Clive, 2nd Baron Clive (being son-in-law of the 1st Earl of the previous creation), was made Earl of Powis, in the County of Montgomeryshire. He had previously represented Ludlow in the House of Commons and served as Lord Lieutenant of Shropshire and Montgomeryshire. Clive was the husband of Lady Henrietta, daughter of the 1st Earl of Powis of the 1748 creation and sister and heiress of the 2nd Earl. He had already been created Baron Clive, of Walcot in the County of Shropshire, in 1794, in the Peerage of Great Britain, and was made Baron Powis, of Powis Castle in the County of Montgomery, Baron Herbert, of Chirbury in the County of Shropshire, and Viscount Clive, of Ludlow in the County of Shropshire, at the same time he was given the earldom. Clive was the son of the famous soldier Robert Clive, who had been raised to the Peerage of Ireland as Baron Clive of Plassey in the County of Clare, in 1762. Known as "Clive of India", he is regarded as a key figure in the establishment of British India.

The 1st Earl was succeeded by his eldest son, the 2nd Earl. He sat as Member of Parliament for Ludlow and served as Lord Lieutenant of Montgomeryshire. In 1807, Lord Powis assumed by Royal licence the surname and arms of Herbert. His son, the 3rd Earl, represented Shropshire North in Parliament and served as Lord Lieutenant of Montgomeryshire. He was succeeded by his nephew, the 4th Earl. He was the son of Lieutenant-General The Rt Hon. Sir Percy Egerton Herbert, second son of the 2nd Earl. Lord Powis was Lord Lieutenant of Shropshire. In 1890, he married Violet Ida Evelyn Herbert (who later became, in 1903, The 16th Baroness Darcy de Knayth, suo jure). Their eldest son Percy Robert Herbert, Viscount Clive, died of wounds received fighting in the Battle of the Somme; their second son Mervyn Horatio Herbert, Viscount Clive, succeeded his mother in the barony on her death in 1929. However, he too predeceased his father and was succeeded in the barony by his daughter Davina as the suo jure 18th Baroness Darcy de Knayth.

Lord Powis was succeeded by his first cousin once removed, the 5th Earl. He was the son of the Hon. Colonel Edward William Herbert, son of the Hon. Robert Charles Herbert, fourth son of the second Earl. On his death the titles passed to his younger brother, the 6th Earl. He was succeeded by his second cousin, the 7th Earl. He was the son of the Right Reverend Percy Mark Herbert, Bishop of Blackburn and of Norwich, son of Major-General the Hon. William Henry Herbert, fifth son of the second Earl.  the peerages are held by his son, the 8th Earl, who succeeded in 1993. Lord Powis is also Lord of the Manor of Clun.

The Hon. Robert Henry Clive, second son of the 1st Earl, married Harriett Windsor (later Baroness Windsor), in 1819. Their grandson Robert Windsor-Clive, 14th Baron Windsor, was created Earl of Plymouth in 1905. Consequently, the present holder of the Earldom of Plymouth is also in remainder to the Earldom of Powis and its subsidiary titles. George Windsor-Clive, second son of the Hon. Robert Henry Clive and Lady Windsor, was Member of Parliament for Ludlow for many years.
 
Another branch of the Clive family was founded by Reverend Benjamin Clive, uncle of the 1st Baron Clive. Members of this branch include George Clive, Edward Clive, George Clive, Edward Clive, Sir Sidney Clive and Sir Robert Clive.

The family seat is Powis Castle, near Welshpool, Montgomeryshire, Wales.

Earl of Powis, first creation (1674)
 see the Marquess of Powis

Earl of Powis, second creation (1748)
 Henry Arthur Herbert, 1st Earl of Powis (1703–1772)
 George Edward Henry Arthur Herbert, 2nd Earl of Powis (1755–1801)

Earl of Powis, third creation

Baron Clive (1762)
 Robert Clive, 1st Baron Clive (1725–1774)
 Edward Clive, 2nd Baron Clive (1754–1839) (created Earl of Powis in 1804)

Earl of Powis (1804)
Edward Clive, 1st Earl of Powis (1754–1839)
Edward Herbert, 2nd Earl of Powis (1785–1848)
Edward James Herbert, 3rd Earl of Powis (1818–1891)
George Charles Herbert, 4th Earl of Powis (1862–1952)
Edward Robert Henry Herbert, 5th Earl of Powis (1889–1974)
Christian Victor Charles Herbert, 6th Earl of Powis (1904–1988)
George William Herbert, 7th Earl of Powis (1925–1993)
John George Herbert, 8th Earl of Powis (born 1952)

The heir apparent is the present holder's son, Jonathan Nicholas William Herbert, Viscount Clive (born 1979).

See also
 Marquess of Powis
 Baron Herbert of Chirbury
 Earl of Plymouth
 Baron Darcy de Knayth
 Ludlow Castle

Notes

References

External links

 
1674 establishments in England
1748 disestablishments in England
1748 establishments in Great Britain
1801 disestablishments in the United Kingdom
1804 establishments in the United Kingdom
Extinct earldoms in the Peerage of Great Britain
Earldoms in the Peerage of the United Kingdom
Noble titles created in 1674
Noble titles created in 1748
Noble titles created in 1804
Earl